Caphys is a genus of snout moths. It was described by Francis Walker in 1863, who designated the type species as Caphys bilinea, a junior synonym for Caphys bilineata. Further information on the creature can be done through BugGuide where one can easily identify insects, spiders and species from their kin that habituate across the United States and Canada.

Species
Caphys arizonensis Munroe, 1970
Caphys bilineata (Stoll, [1781])
Caphys dubia Warren, 1891
Caphys eustelechalis Dyar, 1914
Caphys fovealis Hampson, 1897
Caphys pallida Hampson, 1897
Caphys subrosealis Walker, [1866]
Caphys subsordidalis Dyar, 1914

References

Chrysauginae
Pyralidae genera